Hegarty is an Irish surname. Notable people with the surname include:

Anton Hegarty (1892–1944), British athlete who competed in cross country
Antony Hegarty (born 1971), English singer-songwriter, lead singer of Antony and the Johnsons
Bill Hegarty (born 1927), former American football offensive tackle in the National Football League
Brian Hegarty, Scottish rugby union player
Chris Hegarty (born 1984), Scottish professional footballer who plays as a midfielder
Colin Hegarty, creator of HegartyMaths, an English educational website
Dan Hegarty, Irish radio presenter employed by RTÉ
Den Hegarty (born 1954), rock and roll, doo-wop and a cappella singer
Diarmuid Hegarty (Griffith College), president of Griffith College Dublin
Diarmuid O'Hegarty, Irish revolutionary and civil servant
Dick Hegarty (1885–1917), English footballer
Elliot Hegarty (born 1971), television director of American and British television
Fergal Hegarty, retired Irish athlete
Frances Hegarty or Frances Fyfield (born 1948), British lawyer and crime-writer
Ger Hegarty (born 1966), retired Irish sportsperson
Helene Hegarty (born 1931), member of the England women's cricket team between 1954 and 1963
Herbert George Hegarty, World War I flying ace credited with eight aerial victories
Jack Hegarty (born 1888), American football player and coach of football and basketball
Jimmy Hegarty (born 1940), Irish hurler
John Hegarty (academic), elected 43rd Provost of Trinity College, Dublin, Ireland in 2001
John Hegarty (politician) (born 1947), former Australian politician
John Hegarty (rugby union), Scottish rugby union player
Mary Hegarty, Cork opera soprano
Michael Hegarty, Irish Gaelic footballer
Nick Hegarty (born 1986), English footballer who plays as a left-sided midfielder and wing back
Owen Hegarty (born 1991), of Wetbrain Cheeks fame
Pat Hegarty (born 1948), Irish retired sportsperson
Patrick Hegarty (1926–2002), Irish Fine Gael politician and farmer
Paul Hegarty (born 1954), Scottish former football player
Paul Hegarty (Irish footballer) (born 1967), past Irish footballer, manager of League of Ireland First Division club Finn Harps
Paul Hegarty (musician), musician, author, and university lecturer
Ruth Hegarty (born 1929), Aboriginal Elder and author
Séamus Hegarty (1940–2019), Irish Roman Catholic bishop
Seán O'Hegarty, prominent member of the Irish Republican Army in Cork during the Irish War of Independence
Sean Hegarty, Gaelic footballer from County Kerry
Shannon Hegarty (born 1979), Australian former rugby league footballer
Timothy John Hegarty (born 1965), Northern Irish songwriter
Valerie Hegarty (born 1967), American artist

See also
Bartle Bogle Hegarty, British advertising agency
Hagarty
Hegardt
Hegerty

Surnames of Irish origin